Scinax sateremawe is a frog in the family Hylidae.  It is endemic to Brazil.  Scientist know it from its type locality in the Floresta Nacional de Pau-Rosa.

The adult male frog measures 36.3 mm in snout-vent length.  This frog has large, black-lined orange spots.

This frog lives in forests and nearby open areas.  Scientists have seen it on perched on tree branches and shrubs near permanent ponds and flooded areas.

References

Frogs of South America
Species described in 2010
sateremawe